A Glasgow Bible is a Scots paraphrase of selected passages of the Bible by Jamie Stuart in the Glaswegian dialect.

References

External links
 Review of A Glasgow Bible at GoodReads

1997 books
1997 in Christianity
Scots
Christianity in Scotland
Scots-language works